William L. Vary House is a historic home located at Lima in Livingston County, New York. It was built in 1885 and is a -story, Queen Anne–style frame dwelling.  The plan consists of an irregular massing of rectangular forms, with a profusion of projecting bays, cross gables, porches, and oriels.

It was listed on the National Register of Historic Places in 1989.

References

External links

Houses on the National Register of Historic Places in New York (state)
Queen Anne architecture in New York (state)
Houses completed in 1885
Houses in Livingston County, New York
National Register of Historic Places in Livingston County, New York